The 1992–93 Alpha Ethniki was the 57th season of the highest football league of Greece. The season began on 5 September 1992 and ended on 6 June 1993. AEK Athens won their second consecutive and tenth Greek title. This was the first season in which the new points system was introduced (Win: 3 points - Draw: 1 point - Loss: 0 points), replacing the corresponding 2–1–0 and remained as it is since then.

Teams

Stadia and personnel

 1 On final match day of the season, played on 6 June 1993.

League table

Results

Top scorers

External links
Official Greek FA Site
RSSSF
Greek SuperLeague official Site
SuperLeague Statistics
 

Alpha Ethniki seasons
Greece
1